Frazer Cameron Thomson (14 June 1948 – 7 June 1996) was a Scottish amateur football defender who made over 150 appearances in the Scottish League for Queen's Park. He also captained the club.

Personal life
Thomson worked for Royal Insurance. He died of a short illness in June 1996.

References

1948 births
1996 deaths
Scottish footballers
Scottish Football League players
Queen's Park F.C. players
Association football defenders
Footballers from Glasgow
Scotland amateur international footballers